Joseph Chamberlain (1836–1914) was a British politician and statesman, first a radical Liberal then a leading imperialist.

Joseph Chamberlain may also refer to:

Sir Joseph Austen Chamberlain (1863–1937), British statesman
Joseph Conrad Chamberlin (1898–1962), American arachnologist
Willard Joseph Chamberlin (1890–1971), American entomologist and WWI pilot, known as Joe
Joe Chamberlain (Australian politician) (1900–1984) 
Joe Chamberlain (baseball) (1910–1983), Major League Baseball player
Joseph Chamberlain (planetarium director) (1923–2011), former director of the Adler Planetarium
Joseph W. Chamberlain (1928–2004), atmospheric scientist and 1961 winner of the Helen B. Warner Prize for Astronomy

See also
Chamberlain (surname)
Joseph Chamberlain Sixth Form College, Highgate, Birmingham, England